This is a list of tallest buildings in Tanzania.

List

Timeline of tallest buildings

References

External links
 Dar’s skyscraper boom: Watchers see signs of prosperity

Tanzania
Tall
Tanzania